The FK Partizan Youth School (/Омладинска школа фудбалског клуба Партизан), also known as Belin–Lazarević–Nadoveza youth school, is the youth school for Serbian football club Partizan Belgrade.

It was founded in the 1950s and named after former Partizan players Bruno Belin, Čedomir Lazarević and Branko Nadoveza. The school is well known for its dedicated work with youngsters. Its training philosophy is not only the development of football players, but also to care of their growth and personality forming, while also teaching the sporting spirit and the loyalty to the club. There are around 400 youngsters classified by age categories. There are six age groups, four compete at the level of the Football Association of Serbia, the U17, U16, U15 and U14, while the U13 and U12 compete at the level of the Football Association of Belgrade. Below U12 level there are no official competitions, but players do play in tournaments and friendly matches.

Partizan is the club with most league titles and cup wins in youth competition in Serbia. The youth teams also participate in numerous tournaments around Europe and also organize an U17 international tournament with participation of some of the top European clubs. Partizan also organizes football camps for children in Serbia, Montenegro, Bosnia and Herzegovina, Slovenia, Australia and United States. Many of the best youth academy players move directly to the Partizan senior side, or to the affiliate club Teleoptik Zemun.

All of Partizan's youth categories train at the Partizan sport complex named SC Partizan-Teleoptik along with Partizan's seniors and the players of Teleoptik. Partizan has won several awards for its youth work, including "Best European Youth Work" in 2006, and the club's youth school has been declared the second-best in Europe after that of Ajax Amsterdam. Partizan's academy has produced numerous professional football players or Yugoslav and Serbian internationals.

The Partizan Academy is one of the most renowned and export-oriented in Europe. CIES (University of Neuchâtel International Centre for Sports Studies) Football Observatory report of November 2015 ranks Partizan Belgrade at the top place of training clubs out of the 31 European leagues surveyed

Academy officials

Notable youth graduates

 Stefan Babović
 Dragan Ćirić
 Igor Duljaj
 Ivan Golac
 Nikola Gulan
 Saša Ilić
 Ivica Iliev
 Fahrudin Jusufi
 Vladica Kovačević
 Danko Lazović
 Saša Lukić
 Adem Ljajić
 Lazar Marković
 Savo Milošević
 Aleksandar Mitrović 
 Albert Nađ 
 Matija Nastasić
 Nikola Ninković
 Ivan Obradović
 Veljko Paunović
 Danilo Pantić
 Nemanja Rnić
 Milan Smiljanić 
 Miralem Sulejmani 
 Milutin Šoškić
 Velibor Vasović
 Vladimir Vermezović
 Momčilo Vukotić
 Andrija Živković
 Nikica Klinčarski
 Stevan Jovetić
 Ivica Kralj
 Simon Vukčević

References

External links
 

Academy
P